Joel Frost (September 28, 1765 – September 11, 1827) was an American lawyer and politician from New York.

Life
Joel Frost was born in Carmel, New York on September 28, 1765, the son of John Frost and Huldah (Munson) Frost.  He lived in Yorktown, where in 1789 he married Martha Wright (1771–1860), with whom he had several children, among them John Wright Frost (1792–1882), Elizabeth Frost (1794–1890) and Horace Frost (b. 1806).

Joel Frost was a member of the Westchester County Board of Supervisors in 1803. He was a member of the New York State Assembly in 1806 and 1808. When Putnam County was established in 1812, Frost was appointed Surrogate and returned to his birthplace which was the county seat. He served as Surrogate until 1813, and again from 1815 to 1819, and 1821 to 1822. He was a delegate from Putnam County to the New York State Constitutional Convention of 1821.

Frost was elected as a Crawford Democratic-Republican to the 18th United States Congress, holding office from March 4, 1823, to March 3, 1825.

He did not run for reelection, and relocated to Schenectady, where he was residing when he died on September 11, 1827.  He was buried at the Gilead Cemetery in Carmel.

External links

The New York Civil List compiled by Franklin Benjamin Hough (pages 57, 71, 179, 181, 274, 416; Weed, Parsons and Co., 1858)
Frost Genealogy (Most sources give May 20 as the marriage date, but the Rev. Silas Constant lists May 21 in his Journal.)
The Journal of the Reverend Silas Constant: Pastor of the Presbyterian Church at Yorktown, New York; with some of the records of the church and a list of his marriages, 1784-1825 (page 374)

1827 deaths
Members of the New York State Assembly
People from Yorktown, New York
1765 births
People from Carmel, New York
New York (state) state court judges
Democratic-Republican Party members of the United States House of Representatives from New York (state)